Degüello is the sixth studio album by the American rock band ZZ Top, released in November 1979. It was the first ZZ Top release on Warner Bros. Records and eventually went platinum. It was produced by Bill Ham, recorded and mixed by Terry Manning, and mastered by Bob Ludwig.

Returning from a two-year hiatus, the band began to showcase the influence they have collected during the time away; Gibbons' time in Europe introduced him to punk music, the influences of which seeped into the creation of the album. The band also consciously tried experimenting with technology: Gibbons saw an episode of The Phil Donahue Show where a person's identity was protected using silhouette and a pitch shifter; liking the sound, he asked engineer Manning to call the show and find out what the effects unit was. Manning eventually convinced a reluctant show producer to reveal it, and the effect was used for both vocals and guitars on songs like "Manic Mechanic".

The album marked the first time that ZZ Top featured cover versions on a studio album: "I Thank You" by Isaac Hayes/David Porter and "Dust My Broom", credited on early editions to Elmore James but subsequently credited to Robert Johnson who recorded it in 1936. Elmore James had adapted and popularized the song in 1951.

Meaning of the title
"Degüello" means "decapitation" (literally, a slashing of the throat) or, idiomatically, when something is said to be done "a degüello", it means "no quarter" in Spanish (as in, "no surrender to be given or accepted—a fight to the death"). It was also the title of a Moorish-origin bugle call used by the Mexican Army at the Battle of the Alamo in 1836.

Track listing

Original LP pressings of Degüello credited authorship of "Dust My Broom" to Elmore James.

Personnel
Billy Gibbons – guitar, vocals, baritone saxophone
Dusty Hill – bass guitar, keyboards, backing vocals, lead vocal on "Hi Fi Mama", tenor saxophone
Frank Beard – drums, percussion, alto saxophone

Production
Producer – Bill Ham
Engineer – Terry Manning
Mastering engineer – Bob Ludwig

Charts

Certifications

References

ZZ Top albums
1979 albums
Albums produced by Bill Ham
Warner Records albums